Tingena aurata is a species of moth in the family Oecophoridae. It is endemic to New Zealand. The adults of the species are on the wing in November and December.

Taxonomy 
This species was first described by Alfred Philpott in 1931 using specimens collected by Charles Edwin Clarke at Opoho, Dunedin, in November and December and named Gymnobathra aurata. In 1939 George Hudson discussed and illustrated this species in his book A supplement to the butterflies and moths of New Zealand using the same name. In 1988 J. S. Dugdale placed this species in the genus Tingena. The male holotype specimen is held at the Auckland War Memorial Museum.

Description

Philpott described the species as follows:

Distribution 

This species is endemic to New Zealand.

Behaviour 
This species is on the wing in November and December.

References

Oecophoridae
Moths of New Zealand
Moths described in 1931
Endemic fauna of New Zealand
Taxa named by Alfred Philpott
Endemic moths of New Zealand